An announcement chime is a sound similar to chimes, which is played before or after a manual or automated message to let people know when the announcement begins or ends.

Description 
Announcement chimes are sounds of chimes or similar instruments, which are played before or after a manual or automated announced message. The sound may be created from various methods, including striking chimes, playing an analog recording, or sounding a digital chime.

Used before an announcement, the chime alerts that there is a forthcoming statement. When played after an announcement, the sound of the chime denotes the end of the statement.

Use in transport

Air 
At airports, chimes (usually three or four-tone) play before an automated announcement is said to inform people of the next flight to depart. On aeroplanes, a two-tone chime plays before a safety announcement (e.g., for fastening seatbelts, etc.) or a crew call.

Rail

United Kingdom 
At most stations managed by the train operating companies (TOCs) Great Western Railway and South Western Railway, as well as additionally at most stations now managed by Elizabeth line, but were formerly managed by GWR, and at Carlisle, Llandaf, Shrewsbury and Atherstone, a two-tone chime is played before any automated announcement is made.

In the latter part of the British Rail era, stations with manual announcements were fitted with three or four-tone bell chimes. They still remain this way at Bolton. However, even with KeTech automated announcements being fitted across the north in the 2010s and across the west in the 2000s, some stations such as Plymouth (until around 2013 when it was replaced by an Atos installation), some stations retained the chime (such as East Didsbury and Morpeth), however, all chimes at Northern stations with automated announcements had been removed by 2019.

On most trains, a short two-tone chime is played before an announcement.

See also 

 NBC chimes

Public service announcements